Worlds Within is a 2008 South Korean television series starring Hyun Bin and Song Hye-kyo. It centers on the personal and professional lives of those in the broadcasting industry, offering a realistic look at Korean drama production through the work and romance of two TV directors. The series aired on KBS2 from October 27 to December 16, 2008, on Mondays and Tuesdays at 21:50 (KST) time slot for 16 episodes.

Song previously worked with director Pyo Min-soo on Full House (2004).

Synopsis
Jung Ji-oh (Hyun Bin) and Joo Joon-young (Song Hye-kyo) are two people with vastly different backgrounds. Joon-young is a daughter from a rich family who faces problems regarding her mother's gambling habits and affairs with multiple men; while Ji-oh is a son from a poor family of farmers, though he loves his mom dearly. They were lovers back in their college days, but later had a complicated break-up due to their separate relationships with other people.

When they eventually got back together, Ji-oh and Joon-young began to learn from each other and eventually Joon-young becomes more expressive, warm and understanding. However, Joon-young's mother doesn't approve of Ji-oh, due to his poor background. Ji-oh's pride is deeply wounded by the treatment of Joon-young's mother, so he decides to break up with Joon-young. Joon-young is deeply hurt and doesn't realize the reason of their break-up, and Ji-oh constantly pushes her away. Though he still loves her, he is bothered by their differences in wealth, values and personality. Later, Ji-oh suffers an eye disease which requires an operation and results in him not being able to film. Many conflicts stand in the way of Ji-oh and Joon-young, will they overcome them and make their relationship work?

Cast
 Song Hye-kyo as Joo Joon-young (director)
 Hyun Bin as Jung Ji-oh (director)
 Um Ki-joon as Song Gyu-ho (director)
 Seo Hyo-rim as Jang Hae-jin (rookie actress)
 Kim Kap-soo as Kim Min-chul (drama director)
 Kim Chang-wan as Park Hyun-sup (drama CP)
 Choi Daniel as Yang Soo-kyung (assistant director)
 Lee Da-in as Kim Min-hee (assistant director)
 Pan Yoo-geol as Chul-yi (assistant director)
 Kim Yeo-jin as Lee Seo-woo (drama scriptwriter)
 Bae Jong-ok as Yoon Young (actress)
 Kim Ja-ok as Park Soo-jin (actress)
 Youn Yuh-jung as Oh Min-suk (actress)
 Jung Suk-won as Yoo Chi-han (actor)
 Kim Young-kwang as Young-woong (actor)
 Lee Joon-hyuk as Lee Joon-gi (Joon-young's ex-boyfriend)
 Cha Soo-yeon as Lee Yeon-hee (Ji-oh's ex-girlfriend)
 Oh Chang-seok as Sung So-yoo
 Na Moon-hee as Ji-oh's mother
 Na Young-hee as Joon-young's mother
Jung In-gi as a Cinematographer
 Yoon Jong-hwa as Song Yoo-min
 Lee Jong-goo as Manager Song
 Lee Ho-jae as actor
 Kim Sung-tae
 Baek Jae-jin
 Kim Ji-young as Young's mother

Ratings
In this table,  represent the lowest ratings and  represent the highest ratings.

Awards and nominations

References

External links
  
 
 
 

Korean Broadcasting System television dramas
2008 South Korean television series debuts
2008 South Korean television series endings
Korean-language television shows
South Korean romance television series
Television shows written by Noh Hee-kyung